A steam brig is a two-masted sailing ship with auxiliary steam power.  The advantage was supposed to be that the ship could sail up-wind when it was convenient, and additionally, it could use the steam power to move relative to the wind to obtain a more advantageous angle to the wind.

In practice, the disadvantages combined rather than the advantages.  The type had great wind-resistance, leading to an increased use of fuel up-wind compared to a pure steam ship.  At the same time, the requirement to store coal reduced the cargo space over that of a sailing ship.  It thus combined the slow speed, high maintenance and poor righting (ability to resist capsize and wind) of a sailing ship with the small cargo space and fuel expense of a steam ship.

See also
 sail-plan
 rigging
 sailing ship
 steam ship

Sailboat types
Sailing rigs and rigging
Ship types
Steamboats